The Oxhead school (牛頭宗 Niu-t'ou zong) was a short lived tradition of Chinese Chan Buddhism founded by Fa-jung (Niutou Farong, 牛頭法融, 594–657), who was a Dharma heir of the Fourth Patriarch Tao-hsin (580-651). Their main temple was located at Oxhead Mountain (Niu-t'ou shan) in Chiang-su, near modern Nanjing, hence the name. The school thrived throughout the Tang and the early years of the Song dynasty (10th century).

According to John R. McRae, the original text of an influential Zen work called the Platform Sutra may have originated within the Oxhead school. Another text associated with this school is the Treatise on the Transcendence of Cognition (Chüeh-kuan lun 絶觀論). This text is a dialogue between two hypothetical characters, Professor Enlightenment and the student Conditionality.

Regarding their teachings, according to McRae, they were"fundamentally in agreement with those of the Northern School on the subjects of mental contemplation and the necessity of constant practice,  and both schools were known for their use of contemplative analysis. The major difference between the two schools lay in the Ox-head’s use of a certain logical pattern that included, at one stage, the extensive use of negation. (This distinctive proclivity to negation appears prominently in the mind- verses of the Platform Sutra.)" Their lineage is said to have been transmitted to Japan by Saicho, founder of the Tendai sect.

References

Sources

 

Chan schools